Nelsi Morais (born 22 October 1951) is a Brazilian former professional footballer who played as a midfielder.

Career
Born in Santos, São Paulo, Morais played for Santos and the New York Cosmos.

Morais later played for the New Jersey Eagles of the American Professional Soccer League.

References

1951 births
Living people
Brazilian footballers
Santos FC players
New York Cosmos players
New Jersey Eagles players
North American Soccer League (1968–1984) players
North American Soccer League (1968–1984) indoor players
American Professional Soccer League players
Association football midfielders
Brazilian expatriate footballers
Brazilian expatriate sportspeople in the United States
Expatriate soccer players in the United States
Sportspeople from Santos, São Paulo